Events from the year 1697 in England.

Incumbents
 Monarch – William III
 Parliament – 3rd of King William III

Events
 May – John Vanbrugh's comedy The Provoked Wife premières in London at Lincoln's Inn Fields Theatre.
 15 May – violent hail storm across Hertfordshire, perhaps the most severe ever in Britain.
 30 June – earliest known first-class cricket match takes place, in Sussex.
 20 September – the Treaty of Ryswick ends the War of the Grand Alliance; France recognises William III as King of England.
 2 December – first service (to celebrate the Treaty of Ryswick) held in St Paul's Cathedral since rebuilding work after the Great Fire of London began.
 Trade with Africa Act 1697 (An Act to settle the Trade to Africa) confirms the Royal African Company's loss of monopoly on the Atlantic slave trade, with effect from 1698.
 Poor Act 1697 requires badging of recipients of parish welfare.

Publications
 William Dampier's A New Voyage Round the World, recording the author's adventures in Australasia.
 Daniel Defoe's An Essay upon Projects, favouring the implementation of income tax and the education of women.
 Francis Moore (astrologer) first publishes Old Moore's Almanack.

Births
 10 November – William Hogarth, artist (died 1764)

Deaths
 28 January – Sir John Fenwick, Jacobite conspirator, beheaded (born c. 1645)
 27 March – Simon Bradstreet, colonial magistrate (born 1603)
 8 May – Sir Richard Temple, 3rd Baronet, politician (born 1634)
 7 June – John Aubrey, antiquary and memoirist (born 1626)
 10 June – Francis Pemberton,  Lord Chief Justice of the King's Bench (born 1624)
 12 June – Ann Baynard, natural philosopher (born 1672)
 19 June – Henry Mordaunt, 2nd Earl of Peterborough, diplomat (born 1621)
 18 July – Thomas Dolman, politician (born 1622)
 8 November – Samuel Enys, politician (born 1611)
 Undated – Mary Speke, nonconformist patron and political activist (born c. 1625)
 Probable year – Gilbert Clerke, mathematician, natural philosopher and theologian (born 1626)

References

 
Years of the 17th century in England